MTV Party To Go Volume 10 was the tenth album in the MTV Party To Go series.  The album was certified gold in January 1997 by the RIAA.

Track listing
 "This Is Your Night" (Berman House Mix) – Amber
 "Do You Miss Me?" (Dreamhouse Mix) – Jocelyn Enriquez
 "Your Loving Arms" (Soundfactory Vocal Mix) – Billie Ray Martin
 "Be My Lover" (Club Mix) – La Bouche
 "Macarena" (Radio Version) – Los Del Rio
 "It's All the Way Live (Now)" (Timber Mix) – Coolio
 "Tha Crossroads" (DJ U-Neek's Mo Thug Remix) – Bone Thugs-N-Harmony
 "Lady" (Clean Street Version) – D'Angelo featuring AZ
 "Ain't Nobody" (Main Mix) – Monica featuring Treach
 "Tonite's tha Night" (Redman Clean Remix) – Kris Kross
 "California Love" (Long Radio Edit) – 2Pac featuring Dr. Dre
 "You're the One" (LP Version) – SWV

References

MTV series albums
1996 compilation albums
Tommy Boy Records compilation albums
Dance-pop compilation albums
Hip hop compilation albums